Fábio Joaquim Maciel da Silva (born 29 October 1977), known as Fábio Magrão, is a Brazilian football coach and former player. He was most recently the head coach of the Timor-Leste national football team. Previously, he was the head coach of Kuala Lumpur FA. Fábio also had a successful career as a player, playing at one of the greatest teams of Brazil, Flamengo, and at United Arab Emirates.

Fábio replaced his compatriot Wanderley Junior as Kuala Lumpur's head coach in the middle of the 2017 Malaysia Premier League season, and succeeded on winning 12 of his 14 games, taking Kuala Lumpur FA from 8th to 1st and winning promotion. On 11 October 2017, Fábio extended his contract with Kuala Lumpur for another year. In the 2018 Malaysia Super League, Fábio was successful on avoiding relegation with Kuala Lumpur.

Fábio became Timor-Leste senior and under-23 coach again for the third time in 2021. His highest achievement for the national team, was when he brought the under-23 team to third place in the 2022 AFF U-23 Championship. On 2 September 2022, Fabio terminated his contract with Timor Leste because he had not been receiving his salary for five months.

References

External links
Interview with Fábio Magrão

1977 births
Living people
Brazilian footballers
Timor-Leste national football team managers
CR Flamengo footballers
Centro Sportivo Alagoano players
Zob Ahan Esfahan F.C. players
UAE First Division League players
Khor Fakkan Sports Club players
Al-Arabi SC (UAE) players
Al Jazirah Al Hamra Club players
Emirates Club players
Association football midfielders
Brazilian football managers
Kuala Lumpur City F.C. managers